Azenha (literally Watermill in Portuguese) is a neighbourhood (bairro) in the city of Porto Alegre, the state capital of Rio Grande do Sul, in Brazil.

Neighbourhoods in Porto Alegre